Tjirrkarli is a medium-sized Aboriginal community, located in the Goldfields–Esperance region of Western Australia, within the Shire of Ngaanyatjarraku.

History 
The community was established in the 1980s in the vicinity of a bore put down by Shell Oil. The company was searching for oil and constructed an extensive network of seismic lines, some of which are now used as main access roads to the community or as hunting tracks.

Native title 
The community is located within the determined Ngaanyatjarra Lands (Part A) (WAD6004/04) native title claim area.

Governance 
The community is managed through its incorporated body, Tjirrkarli (Aboriginal Corporation), incorporated under the Aboriginal Councils and Associations Act 1976 on 24 March 1987.

Town planning 
Tjirrkarli Layout Plan No.1 has been prepared in accordance with State Planning Policy 3.2 Aboriginal Settlements. Layout Plan No.1 was endorsed by the community on 3 December 2003 and the Western Australian Planning Commission on 29 June 2004. The Layout Plan map-set and background report can be viewed at Planning Western Australia's web site.

References

External links
 Office of the Registrar of Indigenous Corporations
 Native Title Claimant application summary
 http://tjirrkarli.ngurra.org/

Towns in Western Australia
Shire of Ngaanyatjarraku
Aboriginal communities in Goldfields-Esperance